Diego Henrique França  (born April 6, 1987) is a Brazilian baseball catcher, who is with the Kazusa Magic in the Japanese Amateur Baseball Association. He attended Tokyo Fuji University and represented Brazil at the 2013 World Baseball Classic. He is of Japanese descent on his mother's side.

References

External links
Baseball America

1987 births
2013 World Baseball Classic players
Brazilian expatriate baseball players in Japan
Brazilian people of Japanese descent
Living people
People from Maringá
Sportspeople from Paraná (state)